This is a list of association football clubs located in Croatia, sorted by league and division within the Croatian football league system, as of the 2019–20 season. A total of 98 clubs compete in the top three tiers of the Croatian football pyramid, divided as follows:

Croatian First Football League (also known as Prva HNL or 1. HNL, with 10 clubs)
Croatian Second Football League (also known as Druga HNL or 2. HNL, with 16 clubs)
Croatian Third Football League (also known as Treća HNL or 3. HNL, with five regional subdivisions - Centre (16 clubs), East (16 clubs), North (12 clubs), South (16 clubs) and West (12 clubs) - for a total of 72 clubs)

First Division

Second Division

Third Division

Centre

East

North

South

West

Women's First Division

External links
 League321.com - Club stats records. 

 
Croatia
clubs
Football clubs